Days of War, Nights of Love may refer to:

 Days and Nights of Love and War, a 1978 book by Eduardo Galeano
 Days of War, Nights of Love (book), a collection of political, social, and philosophical essays published by CrimethInc. in 2000
 Days of War, Nights of Love (album), the original title of what became the 2009 rock album Metamorphosis by Papa Roach